Comencini is an Italian surname. Notable people with the surname include:

 Luigi Comencini (1916–2007), Italian film director
 Cristina Comencini (born 1956), Italian film director, scriptwriter and novelist, daughter of Luigi
 Francesca Comencini (born 1961), Italian film director and screenwriter, daughter of Luigi
 Fabrizio Comencini (born 1953), Italian Venetist politician

Italian-language surnames